Temple is a small village in the parish of Blisland on Bodmin Moor in Cornwall, England, UK. The village is bypassed by the A30 road.

History and antiquities 
Temple derives its name from the hospice or preceptory founded by the Knights Templars who built a refuge for pilgrims and travellers, en route to the Holy Land, in the 12th century. On the suppression of the Templars it passed into the hands of the Knights Hospitallers (in 1314), who held it until the religious houses were suppressed by Henry VIII. In 1901 it was a curacy of Warleggan and in 1934, the parish of Temple was incorporated into Blisland parish.

Church 
Temple Church is a Grade II* listed building built c.1120 on land owned by the Knights Templar. It became famous as a place where marriages could be performed without banns or licence (similar to Gretna Green until the early 20th century). This came to an end in 1744 when the church first came under episcopal jurisdiction. By the mid-19th century, it had become a ruin and a final service was held on 29 January 1882, in front of a ″large congregation″ led by the Reverend J Brown. It was rebuilt (by Silvanus Trevail) in the following year. The church is dedicated to St Catherine.

The church contains several references to its links with the Knights Templar, including a cross pattée in the east window and a depiction of a mounted knight in the north window of the church tower.

Crosses 
Arthur Langdon (1896) recorded the existence of eight stone crosses in the parish, including two cross slabs, all in the churchyard. Several of these crosses were subsequently incorporated into a stone outbuilding on the south side of the church.

Gallery

See also

 Templars Preceptory

References

External links 

 GENUKI entry for Temple
 The History of Temple Church (in PDF format)
 Temple Church (from Church Plans Online)
 About the Church

1120 establishments in England
Bodmin Moor
Knights Templar
Villages in Cornwall